The Buggles, a duo consisting of bassist Trevor Horn and keyboardist Geoff Downes, have a discography of two studio albums, a compilation album and video live album, a promotional extended play, nine singles, and three music videos. The Buggles also produced three songs, "Back of My Hand" by The Jags, "Monkey Chop" by Dan-I, and "Film Star" by Tom Marshall. The group formed in 1977 in Wimbledon, South West London, and were signed by Island Records to record and publish their debut studio album, The Age of Plastic, which was released in 1980. The album charted in the UK, Canada, the Netherlands, France, Sweden, and Japan.

The lead single for The Age of Plastic was "Video Killed the Radio Star", released in 1979. The song was a huge commercial success, becoming the 444th number one hit on the UK Singles Chart, spending one week at the top. It was also number 1 on fifteen other international record charts and sold more than five million copies worldwide. It received certifications by the Syndicat National de l'Édition Phonographique and British Phonographic Industry of platinum and gold respectively. Its music video was the first to air on MTV. Three other singles from The Age of Plastic, "Living in the Plastic Age", "Clean, Clean" and "Elstree", achieved chart success in the UK, Germany and the Netherlands. Music videos were made for "Living in the Plastic Age" and "Elstree"

Adventures in Modern Recording, released in 1981, was the second and last album by The Buggles. Five singles from it were released between 1981 and 1982, "I Am a Camera", "Adventures in Modern Recording", "On TV", "Lenny", and "Beatnik". The album and its singles were a commercial failure in the UK, but the album did chart in the United States, peaking at number 161 on the Billboard 200 and at number 7 on the Bubbling Under the Top Rock Albums chart. The album also charted in the Netherlands, as did "I Am a Camera" and "Lenny". "On TV" was certified gold by Music Canada for sales of 5,000 units.

Albums

Studio albums

Compilation

Live video albums

Promotional EPs

Singles

Music videos

Production

Notes
A  The 2010 Japanese reissue of The Age of Plastic made a minor appearance on the Oricon charts, taking the number 225 spot.
B  Adventures in Modern Recording was not able to chart on the Billboard Top 50 Rock Albums, but did manage to reach number seven on Bubbling Under the Top Rock Albums chart, an extension to the Top Rock Albums.

References

External links
The Buggles discography at AllMusic
The Buggles discography on Discogs

Discographies of British artists
Electronic music group discographies
Pop music group discographies
New wave discographies